Claes Richard Vilhelm Luigi Henriksson (born 5 October 1982) is a Swedish former footballer who played as a defender. He played for Djurgårdens IF, IF Brommapojkarna, and Aarhus Gymnastikforening during a career that spanned between 2001 and 2009. A youth international for Sweden between 1997 and 2003, he represented the Sweden U17, U19, and U21 teams a combined total of 23 times.

Honours 

 Djurgårdens IF
 Allsvenskan: 2002, 2003
 Superettan: 2000
Svenska Cupen: 2002

References

Swedish footballers
Djurgårdens IF Fotboll players
IF Brommapojkarna players
Aarhus Gymnastikforening players
1982 births
Living people
Allsvenskan players
Association football defenders
Association football midfielders
Footballers from Stockholm